Marcela Kloosterboer (born July 5, 1983 in Vicente López, Argentina) is an Argentine actress and occasional singer and businesswoman. She won Martín Fierro Award for Best New Actress in 1998 for Verano del '98 and earned Argentine Film Critics Association Award for Best New Actress in 2004 for Roma. Kloosterboer is also known for her roles in television series Chiquititas, Son Amores and Lalola.

Kloosterboer parents' have Dutch heritage.

Career 
Marcela Kloosterboer began her career in 1995, in the children's novel Amigovios issued by Canal 13. In 1996, she begins to appear in the children's novel Mi familia es un dibujo issued by Telefe. She also participated in the series movie Dibu: la película. In 1998, as Josefina Vidal, she was part of the successful television series Verano del '98 issued by Telefe. The following year, in 1999, Cris Morena summons her to be the youth protagonist of the fifth season of the successful television series Chiquititas. In 2000, she returned to Verano del '98 and was part of Ilusiones issued by Canal 13. In 2002 and 2003 she was part of the cast of Son amores. In 2003 she participated in the episode El debilitador social from Los simuladores issued by Telefe. In 2004, she was one of the protagonists of Los pensionados. In cinema she participated in the film Roma. In 2005, she performed in the television series Sin código. During 2006 she was part of the cast of El tiempo no para. In 2007, she made a special participation in telecomedy Lalola. During 2008 she starred in the play Closer. In 2009, she was one of the protagonists of the successful television series Valientes issued by Canal 13. In 2011, together with Marco Antonio Caponi, she co-starred Herederos de una venganza issued by Canal 13. In 2012 she made a special participation in the last chapter of Graduados issued by Telefe. In 2013 she made a special participation, with an antagonistic role in the successful television series Los Vecinos en Guerra issued by Telefe. In 2014, she was summoned to be part of the cast of Sres. Papis issued by Telefe. In 2017 she was one of the protagonists of the successful television series Las Estrellas (telenovela) issued by Canal 13.

Other Work 
In 2015, Marcela Kloosterboer launched its brand of ecological shoes called Klooster´s.

Filmography

Television

Movies

Theater

Discography 
 1999 — Chiquititas Vol. 5

Awards and nominations

Personal life 
She is a good friend of actress Agustina Cherri. Kloosterboer is vegetarian and collaborated in an AnimaNaturalis campaign against the use of fur in 2008. She maintains a friendly relationship with other actors also advocates of animals such as Agustina Cherri, Mariano Martínez, Gastón Pauls, Nicolás Pauls, Nicole Neumann and Cecilia Oviedo. In late 2014, she married former rugby Fernando Sieling. In July 2015, it was announced that the couple was expecting their first child. On March 22, 2016, the actress gave birth to their daughter, Juana Sieling at La Trinidad Sanatorium, in Palermo. On May 29, 2019, she gave birth to their son, Otto.

References

External links 
 

1983 births
21st-century Argentine women singers
Argentine film actresses
Argentine people of Dutch descent
Argentine stage actresses
Argentine telenovela actresses
Argentine television actresses
Living people
People from Vicente López Partido